Louis Le Pensec (born 8 January 1937, in Mellac, Finistère) is a French politician. He is a member of the Socialist Party. Between 1973 and 1997, he was a member of the Parliament. 
Since 27 September 1998, he is a Senator of Finistère.

From 1988 and 1991, he was the spokesman of the French government. Between 1997 and 1998, he was minister of agriculture. He was also the minister for Overseas Territories.

References

1937 births
Living people
People from Finistère
Socialist Party (France) politicians
Government spokespersons of France
French Ministers of Agriculture
French Ministers of Overseas France
Senators of Finistère